The 2016 Green National Convention, in which delegates of the Green Party of the United States chose the party's nominees for president and vice president in the national election, was held August 4–7, 2016 in Houston, Texas. In August 2015, Houston was chosen over a competing proposal from Toledo, Ohio. The Convention was located at the University of Houston with the theme, "Houston, We Have A Solution: Vote Green 2016".
The convention formally nominated Jill Stein as the party's presidential nominee and Ajamu Baraka as her running mate.

Speakers
Several speakers had been confirmed ahead of time; more were announced closer to the convention
 David Cobb, 2004 Green Party presidential nominee and co-founder of Move to Amend
 Andrea Cuellar, former member of the Denver Public Schools Board of Education
 Bruce Dixon, managing editor of Black Agenda Report
 Lisa Fithian, activist, writer, and organizer for United for Peace and Justice
 Howie Hawkins, Green Party activist and perennial candidate
 YahNé Ndgo, activist, author, and singer 
 John Rensenbrink, political scientist and co-founder of the Green Party
 Cornel West, philosopher, academic, social activist, author, member of Democratic Socialists of America, and member of the DNC platform committee
 Keli Yen, Coordinator for Global Greens and former Convenor of the Asia Pacific Greens Federation
 Julian Assange, computer programmer, publisher, journalist, and Editor-in-Chief of WikiLeaks (via video)

Presidential delegate count

Vice Presidential selection
Jill Stein began taking part in the 2016 Green Party presidential primaries in February 2016. Stein was immediately the front-runner and was described by the media as "steamrolling to victory." On June 15, 2016, the Stein campaign announced that it had received 203 delegates, enough to win the nomination on the first ballot at the 2016 Green National Convention. A week before the start of the convention, former Ohio State Senator Nina Turner, who served as a surrogate for Senator Bernie Sanders during his campaign, announced that she had been in discussions with the Stein campaign about possibly serving as Stein's vice presidential pick. The following day, Stein stated that the campaign hadn't chosen a VP candidate yet, and was in discussion with several individuals. On August 1, the Stein campaign announced that Ajamu Baraka had been chosen as Stein's VP candidate. Stein released the names of the final six individuals she had considered as her running mate, with Baraka being the choice. The six contenders for Stein's running mate were:
Ajamu Baraka, founding executive director of the US Human Rights Network and associate fellow at the Institute for Policy Studies
Aaron Dixon, former captain of the Seattle chapter of the Black Panther Party
Dr. Margaret Flowers, former pediatrician, radio host, healthcare activist, and candidate for the United States Senate election in Maryland, 2016
Chris Hedges, Pulitzer Prize-winning journalist and author
Nina Turner, former Ohio State Senator
Kevin Zeese, former executive director of National Organization for the Reform of Marijuana Laws

See also
Green Party of the United States
Green Party presidential primaries, 2016
Green National Convention
Other parties' presidential nominating conventions in 2016:
Democratic
Libertarian
Republican

References

External links
 2016 Green Party Presidential Nominating Convention info

Green National Convention
2016 in Houston
Green Party of the United States National Conventions
Green National Convention
Political conventions in Texas
Green National Convention
Green National Convention|Green National Convention
Conventions in Houston